Spur Independent School District is a public school district based in Spur, Texas, United States.  In addition to Spur, the district also serves the community of McAdoo and a portion of Dickens, as well as rural areas in western and southern Dickens County. A very small portion of Kent County also lies within the district.

Spur ISD has one school that serves students in grades pre-kindergarten through twelve.

On July 1, 1985, portions of the McAdoo Independent School District were incorporated into Spur ISD.

In 2009, the school district was rated "academically acceptable" by the Texas Education Agency.

Notable alumni 
Marshall Formby

References

External links 
Spur ISD

School districts in Dickens County, Texas
School districts in Kent County, Texas